Fernando Jorge Ferreira Pires (born 18 January 1969) is a football manager and former footballer, most notably with Braga. Born in Angola, he represented Portugal internationally.

Club career
He made his professional debut in the Primeira Liga for Braga on 5 October 1986 as a starter in a 0–1 loss to Belenenses. Over his career, he played 217 games on the top level of Portuguese club football.

International
He represented Portugal at the 1986 UEFA European Under-16 Championship.

References

1969 births
People from Zaire Province
Living people
Portuguese footballers
Portuguese football managers
Portugal youth international footballers
Angolan footballers
Angolan football managers
Portuguese sportspeople of Angolan descent
Angolan emigrants to Portugal
S.C. Braga players
Primeira Liga players
F.C. Felgueiras players
C.S. Marítimo players
Vitória F.C. players
Moreirense F.C. players
Liga Portugal 2 players
F.C. Vizela players
Association football forwards
Association football midfielders